Stephen Todd 'Steve' Sarvi is an Iraq War veteran and the 2008 Democratic Farmer Labor Party candidate for U.S. Congress in .

Civic leadership
His experience includes working as city administrator in Lanesboro, Victoria, and Watertown. He was elected to mayor of Watertown in 2000, 2002, and 2004. During this time he served on the Southwest Corridor Transportation Coalition, the Minnesota State Fire Fighters Training Board, Watertown Chamber of Commerce, League of Minnesota Cities Improving Local Economies Committee, Southeast Minnesota Initiative Fund, and the Council on Collaboration. He also served several years on the Lanesboro Fire Department/Ambulance Service as a Firefighter and EMT-B.

Military service
At the age of 17, Sarvi enlisted in the Army Reserves and served as an infantryman. When attending the University of Minnesota, Steve enrolled in ROTC and switched from the Reserves to the Minnesota National Guard. He was commissioned a second lieutenant and served as a platoon leader for a tank company based in Chisholm, Minnesota. In 1985, he graduated from the US Army Airborne School and in 1987, after graduating from the University of Minnesota with a bachelor's degree in Political Science and minor in Humanities, he joined the Active Army with a Regular Army commission.

At the Armor Officers Basic Course at Fort Knox, Kentucky, he graduated in the top 3 of the class. Then he served with the 4th Infantry Division at Fort Carson, Colorado as a tank platoon leader, company executive officer, and assistant operations officer for the 3rd Battalion 68th Armored Regiment. In 1992 he left the Army at the rank of captain. Sarvi joined the Minnesota Army National Guard in 1999 as a sergeant and was assigned to the 2nd Battalion, 135th Infantry Regiment, stationed at West St. Paul.  Following 9/11 his unit was called upon to provide security at the Minneapolis-Saint Paul International Airport.  Then, in 2003, he was deployed to Kosovo to provide security on the border between Kosovo and the Republic of Macedonia.

In 2005, he resigned his mayorship to serve in the Minnesota National Guard in Iraq. As Infantry Platoon Sergeant, Sarvi volunteered to serve in the 34th Infantry Division which served sixteen months in southern Iraq as part of Operation Iraqi Freedom.

2008 U.S. Representative campaign

On October 4, 2007, Sarvi announced he would challenge John Kline for Minnesota's 2nd congressional district seat. He believes that a change in U.S. policy in Iraq is needed. Although the district leans Republican with a Cook Partisan Voting Index of R+3, Kline's unwavering support for Bush and the Iraq War may make him vulnerable to a challenger in 2008. At a rally at St. Olaf College three days before the election,(where the opening act was performed by notable Minneapolis Hip Hop mainstays Ill Chemistry, featuring Karnage and Desdamona) a former congressmen fired up the crowd of 200 or so college students, shouting, "And lets get a big hand for Steve Sarvi! You know, the day after the election, the pundits are gonna go around the country and look at some of these elections where the democrat wasn't supposed to win. They're gonna look at Minnesota's second congressional district and say, 'How did Steve Sarvi do it?'". Sarvi would go on to lose the election by 14.8%.

Personal life
Sarvi lives in Watertown, in Carver County, is married, and has three school-aged children.

References

External links
Steve Sarvi for U.S. Congress official campaign website
 
Campaign contributions at OpenSecrets.org

1965 births
Living people
University of Minnesota alumni
People from East St. Louis, Illinois
American people of Finnish descent
Minnesota Democrats
People from Watertown, Minnesota
People from Lanesboro, Minnesota
Minnesota National Guard personnel